Ubiquinol-cytochrome c reductase complex assembly factor 3 is a protein that in humans is encoded by the UQCC3 gene. Located in mitochondria, this protein is involved in the assembly of mitochondrial Complex III, stabilizing supercomplexes containing Complex III. Mutations in the UQCC3 gene cause Complex III deficiency with symptoms of hypoglycemia, hypotonia, lactic acidosis, and developmental delays. This protein plays an important role as an antiviral factor, bolstering the ability of cells to inhibit viral replication, independent of interferon production. The UQCC3 protein can be cleaved by OMA1 metalloprotease during mitochondrial depolarization, targeting the cell for apoptosis. Depletion of this protein alters cardiolipin composition, causing cellular and mitochondrial defects.

Structure 
The UQCC3 gene is located on the q arm of chromosome 11 in position 12.3 and spans 2,036 base pairs. The gene produces a 10.1 kDa protein composed of 93 amino acids. This protein faces the intermembrane space. It possesses an N-terminal signal peptide and a signal transmembrane structure, in addition to several phosphorylation sites. The secondary structure of this protein is made up mostly of random coils and alpha helices. Alpha helices 2 and 3 bind to cardiolipin.

Function 
The UQCC3 gene encodes a protein that functions in complex III assembly, downstream of assembly factors UQCC1 and UQCC2. This is evidenced by the observation that UQCC3 levels are reduced in cells with decreased levels of UQCC1 and UQCC2, but lack of the UQCC3 protein does not affect levels of UQCC1 and UQCC2. Predicted to be a secretary protein with small molecular weight, this protein has important functions in cellular proliferation and antiviral innate immune regulation. Expression of this protein is ubiquitous in carcinomas, along with normal tissues. During the early stages of Complex III assembly, the UQCC3 protein stabilizes supercomplexes containing Complex III, most notably the III2/IV supercomplex.

Clinical Significance 
In the sole recorded case of a mutation in the UQCC3 gene, a patient with a homozygous missense mutation presented with nuclear type 9 complex III deficiency, displaying symptoms of hypoglycemia, hypotonia, lactic acidosis, severe delayed psychomotor development, and other developmental delay. The patient also had decreased levels of cytochrome b within Complex III.

The UQCC3 protein also has a role as an antiviral factor, independent of interferon production. Levels of this protein increase in response to a viral infection, improving the ability of cells to inhibit viral replication. Overexpression of the UQCC3 gene increases transcription of OAS3 while knockdown of RNase L or OAS3 hampers the antiviral effect of UQCC3. Signaling from UQCC3 to the OAS-RNase L system is independent of interferon production. This protein is also regulated by expression of the double-stranded RNA-dependent protein kinase EIF2AK2.

Depleted levels of the UQCC3 protein cause impaired respiration and subtle yet significant alterations in cardiolipin composition, which then result in abnormal crista morphology, increased sensitivity to apoptosis, and decreased levels of ATP. Furthermore, mitochondrial depolarization causes OMA1 metalloprotease to cleave the UQCC3 protein; effectively, this mechanism targets cells with damaged mitochondria for apoptosis.

Interactions 
This protein associates with the rest of mitochondrial Complex III and has protein-protein interactions with PHLDA3.

References

Further reading 

 
 

Human proteins
Mitochondrial proteins